Eublemma rufipuncta is a moth of the family Noctuidae first described by Turner in 1902. It is found in Australia.

Original description

References

External links
Australian Faunal Directory

Moths of Australia
Eustrotiinae
Moths described in 1902